Greci is a commune located in Mehedinți County, Oltenia, Romania. It is composed of six villages: Bâltanele, Blidaru, Greci, Sălătruc, Valea Petrii and Vișina.

The commune is 2 kilometers away from the DN6 national road.

References

Communes in Mehedinți County
Localities in Oltenia